Maryland Route 344 (MD 344) is a state highway in the U.S. state of Maryland.  Known as Chicamuxen Road, the state highway runs  from MD 6 in Doncaster north to MD 224 near Chicamuxen.  A connector between MD 6 and MD 224 in western Charles County, MD 344 was originally the southernmost part of MD 224.  When MD 224 was rerouted to the west in the mid-1950s, MD 344 was assigned to its present course.

Route description

MD 344 begins at an intersection with MD 6 (Port Tobacco Road) in the hamlet of Doncaster.  County-maintained Gilroy Road is the south leg of the four-way intersection.  The state highway heads northwest as a two-lane undivided road through farmland and forest.  MD 344 reaches its northern terminus at a T-intersection with MD 224 near Chicamuxen.  Northbound MD 224 heads straight as Chicamuxen Road while southbound MD 224 heads west from the intersection as Riverside Road.

History
The highway to which MD 344 is now assigned was originally the southern part of MD 224, which extended north to the District of Columbia boundary in Forest Heights.  The Doncaster–Chicamuxen portion of MD 224 was constructed in 1930.  When MD 224 was placed onto Riverside Road south to Riverside in 1957, MD 344 was assigned to the portion of Chicamuxen Road south of the MD 224–MD 344 intersection.

Junction list

See also

References

External links

MDRoads: MD 344

344
Maryland Route 344